Skip Brandt (born May 26, 1964) is an American politician and businessman who served as a member of the Idaho Senate from 2000 to 2006. A Republican, Brandt has since served as a member of the Idaho County, Idaho Commission.

Early life 
Brandt was born in Grangeville, Idaho and raised in Kooskia, Idaho.

Career 
Prior to serving as a member of the Idaho Senate, Brandt was mayor of Kooskia. Brandt was elected to the Senate in 2000 and assumed office in 2001, succeeding Marguerite McLaughlin. He served until 2006 and was succeeded by Leland G. Heinrich. During his tenure in the Senate, Brandt served as chair of the Transportation Committee and as a member of the  Health and Welfare Committee. In addition to his career in politics, Brandt owns and operates a hardware store.

In March 2020, Brandt was appointed to the Western Interstate Region Board. He has served as a member of the Idaho County Commission since 2007. During the 2016 United States Senate election in Idaho, Brandt served as incumbent Senator Mike Crapo's Idaho County campaign chair.

Brandt was an early supporter of Donald Trump during the 2016 Republican Party presidential primaries served as a delegate to the 2016 Republican National Convention. In the 2020 election, Brandt was nominated to serve as a Trump delegate to the 2020 Republican National Convention.

References 

Living people
County commissioners in Idaho
1964 births
People from Idaho County, Idaho
Republican Party Idaho state senators
People from Grangeville, Idaho